Gillian Peele (born 1949) is a British academic in the field of British, American and comparative politics.  She is an emeritus fellow of Lady Margaret Hall, University of Oxford, having retired from teaching in 2016, and in August 2021 began serving a five year term as an independent member on the Committee on Standards in Public Life (CSPL) of the United Kingdom.

Life
Peele was born in 1949.  She received education at Durham University, St Anne's College, Oxford, and Nuffield College, Oxford.  In 1975 she was appointed as first Fellow and Tutor in Politics at Lady Margaret Hall, Oxford (LMH), and she was also an associate professor in the university's Department of Politics and International Relations. She retired in 2016 and has the status of emeritus professor and fellow.

On 11 December 1980 Peele was on the panel of the BBC Question Time debate programme.

Peele was to serve as an independent on the House of Lords Appointments Commission from 2013 until 2019.  In September 2016, Peele retired from her position at LMH as well as that Associate Professor with the Oxford University Department of Politics and International Relations.

Peele, together with Ewen Fergusson, was appointed as an independent member to the UK's  Committee on Standards in Public Life (CSPL) in August 2021 for a five-year term.  Peele had previously co-authored an analysis on the subject in 2016.

Selected publications

References

Footnotes

Sources

External links
 

Living people
1949 births
Fellows of Lady Margaret Hall, Oxford
Alumni of Nuffield College, Oxford
Alumni of Durham University
Alumni of St Anne's College, Oxford
Member of the Committee on Standards in Public Life